Big Brother 2011 , also known as Big Brother: The Secret is the eleventh season of German reality series Big Brother. The season began on 2 May 2011 and was planned to end on 9 August 2011, lasting 100 days. However, the network announced that the season would be extended by 5 weeks. As a result, it lasted 135 days and ended on 12 September 2011.

The launch show was hosted by Sonja Zietlow while the rest of the season was hosted by Aleksandra Bechtel, the presenter from seasons 2 to 4 and 10. Rayo di Sole was crowned the winner of the season and won €125,000.

Format 
Big Brother has chosen 30 hopefuls to move into the house. 14 housemates were chosen by Big Brother and the final housemate was picked by a public vote. Each housemate had a secret which one has to keep in the house, otherwise the housemate will automatically face eviction and the housemate who guessed it correctly will receive immunity from evictions and final ticket, but an incorrect guess will also result in facing eviction.

However, the housemate will only have the ticket as long as no other secret is disclosed. The ticket will be going over until a certain point in the series where the owner will have the ticket for good and be a finalist.

Furthermore, housemates will nominate every two weeks with the housemates with the most votes face eviction. They will participate in weekly tasks and matches for treats or to avoid punishments.

Housemates

Secrets

Nominations Table

Notes 

 As Tim incorrectly guessed David's secret, Timmy incorrectly guessed Daggy's secret, Valencia incorrectly guessed Jordan's secret, Jasmin incorrectly guessed Timmy's secret, and Hedia's secret was discovered by Rene, all five are automatically up for eviction.
 Tim was planned to be nominated, because of Hedia's correct guessing about his secret, but he left before the nomination started. Valencia was nominated because Ingrid correctly guessed her secret. Fabienne & Timmy were nominated because Daggy correctly guessed their secret. Steve was automatically nominated as a punishment because he revealed his secret to René & Timmy which he wasn't allowed to do. Jasmin correctly guessed Lisa's secret, therefore Lisa is automatically nominated.
 Jordan was planned to be nominated, because of René's correct guessing about her secret, but she left before the nomination started. Due to her re-entrance, the nomination remains in effect. Valencia was nominated because she incorrectly guessed Jasmin's secret and likewise Jasmin, who incorrectly guessed Barry's secret. Valencia was planned to be nominated but she left the house after nominations.
 Ingrid was nominated because Cosimo correctly guessed her secret.
 Only male housemates can be nominated.
 Because of her win in a live match, Benson's nomination counted double.
 Ingrid was nominated because she incorrectly guessed Alex's secret.
 Benson was planned to be nominated, because of Cosimo's correct guessing about her secret, but she got evicted before the nomination started.
 Benny was nominated because Rayo correctly guessed his secret. As he revealed his secret beforehand, he is nominated for the next two evictions.
 Jaquelina go the "Key of Temptation" which gave her immunity and the ability to nominate one person for eviction. She nominated Steve.

External links
Official Homepage

11
2011 German television seasons